Round Valley is a census-designated place (CDP) in Inyo County, California, United States. The population was 435 at the 2010 census, up from 278 at the 2000 census.

Geography

According to the United States Census Bureau, the CDP has a total area of 13.8 square miles (35.8 km2), over 99% of it land.

Demographics

2010
At the 2010 census Round Valley had a population of 435. The racial makeup of Round Valley was 333 (76.6%) White, 38 (8.7%) African American, 21 (4.8%) Native American, 3 (0.7%) Asian, 0 (0.0%) Pacific Islander, 27 (6.2%) from other races, and 13 (3.0%) from two or more races. Hispanic or Latino of any race were 69 people (15.9%).

The census reported that 324 people (74.5% of the population) lived in households, no one lived in non-institutionalized group quarters and 111 (25.5%) were institutionalized.

There were 141 households, 37 (26.2%) had children under the age of 18 living in them, 67 (47.5%) were opposite-sex married couples living together, 14 (9.9%) had a female householder with no husband present, 8 (5.7%) had a male householder with no wife present.  There were 16 (11.3%) unmarried opposite-sex partnerships, and 0 (0%) same-sex married couples or partnerships. 36 households (25.5%) were one person and 8 (5.7%) had someone living alone who was 65 or older. The average household size was 2.30.  There were 89 families (63.1% of households); the average family size was 2.72.

The age distribution was 63 people (14.5%) under the age of 18, 29 people (6.7%) aged 18 to 24, 166 people (38.2%) aged 25 to 44, 148 people (34.0%) aged 45 to 64, and 29 people (6.7%) who were 65 or older.  The median age was 39.8 years. For every 100 females, there were 155.9 males.  For every 100 females age 18 and over, there were 177.6 males.

There were 155 housing units at an average density of 11.2 per square mile (4.3/km2),of which 141 were occupied, 45 (31.9%) by the owners and 96 (68.1%) by renters.  The homeowner vacancy rate was 0%; the rental vacancy rate was 4.0%.  90 people (20.7% of the population) lived in owner-occupied housing units and 234 people (53.8%) lived in rental housing units.

2000
At the 2000 census there were 278 people, 115 households, and 77 families in the CDP.  The population density was 20.1 people per square mile (7.7/km2).  There were 155 housing units at an average density of 11.2 per square mile (4.3/km2).  The racial makeup of the CDP was 91.37% White, 3.96% Native American, 2.16% Asian, 1.44% from other races, and 1.08% from two or more races.  5.04% of the population were Hispanic or Latino of any race.
Of the 115 households 33.9% had children under the age of 18 living with them, 54.8% were married couples living together, 12.2% had a female householder with no husband present, and 33.0% were non-families. 27.0% of households were one person and 5.2% were one person aged 65 or older.  The average household size was 2.42 and the average family size was 2.88.

The age distribution was 27.7% under the age of 18, 4.3% from 18 to 24, 28.8% from 25 to 44, 31.3% from 45 to 64, and 7.9% 65 or older.  The median age was 40 years. For every 100 females, there were 87.8 males.  For every 100 females age 18 and over, there were 86.1 males.

The median household income was $43,750 and the median family income  was $49,688. Males had a median income of $41,500 versus $32,857 for females. The per capita income for the CDP was $21,589.  4.1% of the population and 1.7% of families were below the poverty line.   none under the age of 18 and none 65 and older were living below the poverty line.

Government

References

Census-designated places in Inyo County, California
Owens Valley
Populated places in the Sierra Nevada (United States)